Henri Garnier (19 September 1908 – 4 January 2003) was a Belgian professional road cyclist. He most notably won the 1936 Tour de Suisse.

Major results
1934
 7th Overall Tour de Suisse
1935
 2nd Overall Tour of Belgium
 3rd Overall Tour de Suisse
 3rd GP de la Famenne
1936
 1st  Overall Tour de Suisse
1st  Mountains classification
1st Stage 1
 4th Overall Tour of Belgium
1937
 8th La Flèche Wallonne
 10th Liège–Bastogne–Liège

References

External links
 

1908 births
2003 deaths
Belgian male cyclists
Tour de Suisse stage winners
People from Beauraing
Cyclists from Namur (province)